Heal is the fourth studio album by American thrash metal band Sacred Reich, released February 27, 1996, via Metal Blade Records. It is the band's final full-length studio album to feature guitarist Jason Rainey, and was their last one for 23 years, until the release of Awakening in August 2019.

Track listing

Credits
 Phil Rind – vocals, bass
 Wiley Arnett – lead guitar
 Jason Rainey – rhythm guitar
 Dave McClain – drums
 Produced by Bill Metoyer and Sacred Reich

References

External links
Sacred Reich official website
BNR Metal discography page
Encyclopaedia Metallum album page

1996 albums
Sacred Reich albums
Metal Blade Records albums